The Central District of Khoshab County is a district (bakhsh) in Khoshab County, Razavi Khorasan Province, Iran.  At the 2006 census, its population was 26,993, in 7,284 families.  The District has one city: Soltanabad.  The District has three rural districts (dehestan): Robat-e Jaz Rural District, Soltanabad Rural District, and Tabas Rural District.

References 

Districts of Razavi Khorasan Province
Khoshab County